The National American Football Championship of Romania (CNFA) is the elite league for American football in Romania. It was formed in 2010. Playing rules are based on those of the American NCAA. Each end of season culminates with the championship game, known as the Romanian Bowl.

The popularity of American football in Romania can also be attributed to the nation's interest in the career of Romanian-born American punter for the New England Patriots of the NFL, Zoltán Meskó.

History

The league is played annually, and it follows NCAA rules. A flag championship is also organized every year, to better promote the sport.

The first-ever game in the history of the championship was played on July 24, and it featured the Timişoara Lions and Cluj Crusaders.

On November 21, 2010, in Bucharest, the Bucharest Warriors met the Cluj Crusaders, in the first-ever Romanian Bowl. The home team won the game, 56–12, becoming the first champion of Romania.

Bucharest Warriors retained the CNFA title in 2011, after 14–6 and 15–20 against the same opponent from the previous year, Cluj Crusaders.

Teams

Romanian Bowl
The Romanian Bowl is the CNFA championship game, the Romanian equivalent of the NFL's Super Bowl.

See also
Romanian American Football Federation
Romania national American football team
Official site

References

American football leagues in Europe
2010 establishments in Romania
Sports leagues established in 2010
American football in Romania
American football